A base camp is a staging area used by mountaineers to prepare for a climb.

Base camp or basecamp may also refer to:

 Basecamp (company), a web application company
 Basecamp (software), a project management tool developed by the Basecamp company
 Basecamp (DJs)
 Basecamp Productions, a record label
 Basecamp Valley, in the Jones Mountains of Antarctica
 Military camp

See also
 Base (disambiguation)
 Camp (disambiguation)